Sandi Križman (born 17 August 1989) is a Croatian professional footballer who plays as a forward.

Club career

Born in Pula, he started his career in his hometown club NK Žminj, where he scored seven goals in 22 matches, aged 17. In the summer of 2007 he followed his uncle, the coach Igor Pamić to NK Karlovac, another Treća HNL team at the time. His performances there drew the attention of HNK Rijeka, with whom he signed a three-and-a-half-year contract in January 2008. He was sent back to Karlovac for the remainder of the season, scoring 15 goals in 24 league matches for the club that season. He spent the subsequent three-and-a-half years with Rijeka, scoring nine goals for the club. He had moderate success with Rijeka, leading to his transfer to Istra 1961, where he scored 7 goals in the first 13 games.

On 6 January 2014, it was officially announced that Križman joined the South Korean club Jeonnam Dragons.

On 5 February 2017, he joined Slovenian club FC Koper.

AEL
On 7 July 2017 AEL announced the signing of Križman on a three-year contract. On 30 September 2017 he scored his first goal in a 1–1 home draw against PAOK. On 22 October 2017 he scored the winner in a 1–0 away win against Platanias, which was the first in seven years. Three days later he sealed his team's 3–0 home win against Panachaiki in the domestic cup. On 9 December 2017, Križman sealed a dramatic late victory for Larissa over Xanthi, with the Croatian striker scoring the only goal of the match in the additional time. On 7 February 2018 he opened the score in a 3–2 home win against PAS Giannina, which helped his team to qualify for the semi-finals of the Greek Cup.
On 1 March 2018, he scored a decisive goal in a 2–1 home win in the first leg of the semi-finals of the Greek Cup against AEK Athens.

PAS Giannina 
On 26 July 2018, he joined PAS Giannina. On 25 September 2018, he scored his first goal for the team in a 2–1 away win against Atromitos in the group stages of the Greek Cup. On 29 September 2018, he scored his first Superleague goal for the club, opening the score in a 2–1 away loss against Panathinaikos. On 25 November 2018, Križman scored a brace as PAS Giannina secured a home win over Levadiakos at Zosimades Stadium to lift them out of the bottom section of the Super League table. With the club of Ioannina he won the Super League Greece 2: 2019–20 and got promoted to the Super League Greece, been the second top scorer with 10 goals together with Jean-Baptiste Léo the other forward of PAS Giannina.

Rheindorf Altach
On 13 January 2023, Križman's contract with Rheindorf Altach was terminated by mutual consent.

Honours
PAS Giannina
Super League Greece 2: 2019–20

NK Karlovac
3.HNL – West: 2007–08

Individual
 Top scorer Super League Greece 2 Runner- Up 2019–20 (10 goals)

References

External links
 

1989 births
Living people
Sportspeople from Pula
Association football forwards
Association football wingers
Croatian footballers
Croatia youth international footballers
Croatia under-21 international footballers
NK Žminj players
NK Karlovac players
HNK Rijeka players
NK Istra 1961 players
Jeonnam Dragons players
NK Slaven Belupo players
FK Željezničar Sarajevo players
FC Koper players
Athlitiki Enosi Larissa F.C. players
PAS Giannina F.C. players
SC Rheindorf Altach players
Croatian Football League players
K League 1 players
Premier League of Bosnia and Herzegovina players
Slovenian PrvaLiga players
Super League Greece players
Austrian Football Bundesliga players
Austrian Regionalliga players
Croatian expatriate footballers
Expatriate footballers in South Korea
Croatian expatriate sportspeople in South Korea
Expatriate footballers in Bosnia and Herzegovina
Croatian expatriate sportspeople in Bosnia and Herzegovina
Expatriate footballers in Slovenia
Croatian expatriate sportspeople in Slovenia
Expatriate footballers in Greece
Croatian expatriate sportspeople in Greece
Expatriate footballers in Austria
Croatian expatriate sportspeople in Austria